Mattia Furlan (born 5 June 1993) is an Italian male  BMX rider, representing his nation at international competitions. He competed in the time trial event at the 2015 UCI BMX World Championships.

References

External links
 
 
 

1993 births
Living people
BMX riders
Italian male cyclists
Cyclists at the 2010 Summer Youth Olympics
European Games competitors for Italy
Cyclists at the 2015 European Games
Sportspeople from Vicenza
Cyclists from the Province of Vicenza